Moto Shah Dam is small earth core rock-fill dam operational in Mohmand Agency of FATA, Pakistan.

Construction of project started in 2012, and was completed on 30 August 2014 at a cost of PKR 191.60 Million. The dam has a height 101 of feet and length of 377 feet.

The dam will irrigate area of 627 acres cultivable lands, with total water storage capacity of around 1140 acres.

See also
 List of dams and reservoirs in Pakistan

References

Dams in Pakistan
Buildings and structures in Khyber Pakhtunkhwa
Rock-filled dams
Dams completed in 2014
2014 establishments in Pakistan
Dams in Khyber Pakhtunkhwa